Tatlı Küçük Yalancılar (Sweet Little Liars) is a Turkish psychological thriller drama series produced by O3 Media and aired for the first time on July 6, 2015 on Star TV. Based on the popular American series Pretty Little Liars, it stars Burak Deniz, Şükrü Özyıldız, Bensu Soral, Büşra Develi, Melisa Şenolsun, Dilan Çiçek Deniz, and Beste Kökdemir.

After years, Dilan Çiçek Deniz and Burak Deniz played in "Yarım Kalan Aşklar" and "Kal". Burak Deniz and Büşra Develi played in Arada. Burak Deniz and Melisa Şenolsun played in Koton commercial. Dilan Çiçek Deniz and Alperen Duymaz played in "Çukur" and "Bodrum Masalı". Büşra Develi and Alperen Duymaz played in Erkek Severse. Şükrü Özyıldız and Melisa Şenolsun played in Nefes Nefese. Şükrü Özyıldız and Büşra Develi played in Akıncı.

Plot
The plot follows the lives of four friends, Aslı, Selin, Ebru and Hande after the disappearance of Açelya, the fifth friend of the group. A year later they begin to receive anonymous messages from someone calling himself "A". The messages threaten to reveal all their secrets, even some that only Açelya knew.

Cast
 Şükrü Özyıldız as Eren
 Bensu Soral as Aslı
 Büşra Develi as Selin
 Melisa Şenolsun as Hande
 Dilan Çiçek Deniz as Ebru
 Beste Kökdemir as Açelya / Akasya
 Burak Deniz as Toprak
 Alperen Duymaz as Cesur
 Merve Çağıran as Janset
 Tülay Günal as Vildan
 Esra Ronabar as Ilgın
 Mehmet Ozan Dolunay as Barış
 Deniz Can Aktaş as Seçkin
 Kaan Yılmaz as Ilgaz
 Esra Ruşan as Melis
 Almıla Uluer Atabeyoğlu as Emel
 Özge Özacar as Müge
 Gökçe Yanardag as Asuman
 Olgun Teker as Güven

References

External links
 

Turkish television series
Pretty Little Liars (franchise)
Television series produced in Istanbul
Television shows set in Istanbul
2015 Turkish television series debuts
2015 Turkish television series endings
Turkish drama television series
Turkish television series based on American television series
Television series by Warner Bros. Television Studios